The 2008 Pan-American Volleyball Cup was the third edition of the annual men's volleyball tournament, played by seven countries from June 2 to June 7, 2008 in Winnipeg, Manitoba, Canada. The winner of each pool automatically advanced to the semi-finals and the teams placed in second and third met in crossed matches in the quarterfinals round.

Competing Nations

Squads

Preliminary round

Group A

June 2, 2008

June 3, 2008

June 4, 2008

Group B

June 2, 2008

June 3, 2008

June 4, 2008

Final round

Quarterfinals
Thursday June 5, 2008

Classification 5–6
Friday June 6, 2008

Semifinals
Friday June 6, 2008

Classification 6–7
Saturday June 7, 2008

Championship Round
Saturday June 7, 2008

Final ranking

Individual awards

Most Valuable Player

Best Scorer

Best Spiker

Best Blocker

Best Server

Best Digger

Best Setter

References
 Results

Men's Pan-American Volleyball Cup
P
Vol
Volleyball
2008 in Manitoba